Ginestà is a Catalan musical dúo formed based in Barcelona, composed of siblings Júlia and Pau Serrasolsas despite initially being conceived as a quartet. Still independent artists, their musical style consists of a mix of pop, folk and experimental music. Formed in early 2018, the dúo released their debut studio album Neix to commercial failure the same year as its formation. Their following album, Ginestà (2019) received critical acclaim uppon the indie music scene and spawned the single "Estimar-te Com la Terra", which became quite popular in Catalonia. Ginestà has also become notable due to its advocacy for the preservation of the Catalan language.

Discography

Studio albums

Singles

References

Spanish musical duos
Musical groups from Catalonia